The Levinstein Tower is a skyscraper in Tel Aviv, Israel. At 125 metres in height, the tower has 35 floors. The tower was designed by Rapoport Architects, and was completed in 2000 drawing inspiration in its design from the Century Tower in the city.

Originally, the tower was set to be a 74 metre tall, 17-storey tower, although this changed to a 35 floor tower, with 5 residential storeys at the top, with a total height of 145 metres. These were dropped, however, due to a lack of demand for luxury apartments at the time. Each floor in the tower is 1000 square metres in size, with the ground floor having a double-height 1,500 square metre lobby.

See also
Architecture of Israel
Economy of Israel
List of skyscrapers in Israel

References
Footnotes

External links
Levinstein Tower on Emporis
Levinstein Tower on CTBUH
Levinstein Tower on Skyscraperpage.com
Levinstein Tower on Structurae

Office buildings completed in 2000
Skyscrapers in Tel Aviv
2000 establishments in Israel
Skyscraper office buildings in Israel